HTMLGIANT is an online literature blog founded by American author Blake Butler. It presents itself as a "literature blog that isn't always about literature", and includes book reviews and interviews. It is considered to be an important outlet for alternative literature, a loosely defined literary movement.

History
The website was founded in 2008 by Gene Morgan and Blake Butler. In 2014, the site shut down due to allegations of sexual misconduct by members of the alt-lit community. Two years after shutting down, the site was brought back online in 2016.

Contributors
Notable contributors include Roxane Gay.

References

External links 
 

American literature websites
Internet properties established in 2008